Park Se-young is a Korean name consisting of the family name Park (Pak, Bak) and the given name Se-young (Se-yeong, Se-yong). It may refer to:

 Park Se-young (born 1988), a South Korean actress
 Park Se-young (footballer) (born 1989), a South Korean footballer
 Park Se-yeong (born 1993), a South Korean short track speed skater
 Pak Se-yong (1902–1989), a North Korean poet